Melissa Hitchman was Australia's Ambassador to the Holy See from 2016 to 2020, when she was replaced by Chiara Porro.

Hitchman graduated with a Master of National Security and a Bachelor of Economics from the Australian National University.

References

 

Ambassadors of Australia to the Holy See
Australian women ambassadors
Australian National University alumni
Year of birth missing (living people)
Living people